Stanislav Tyulenev (born 2 January 1973) is a Soviet and Kyrgyz former professional footballer of Russian origin who played as a goalkeeper.

Career
Pupil of Alga Bishkek. In 1991-1992 he played for the team of his hometown Alga Bishkek, with which in 1992 he won the first independent Kyrgyzstan League of Kyrgyzstan. In 1993 he moved to the Ukrainian club Dnipro Cherkasy in Ukrainian Second League. With the Cherkasy team he won the Ukrainian Second League in the season 1992–93 and won the right to play in the Ukrainian First League. For three incomplete seasons in Cherkasy, Tyulenev could not get the place of the main goalkeeper, he played in only 23 matches. Since 1994 he played in the teams Desna Chernihiv, Kolos Krasnodar, Mykolaiv, but not in any of these teams also did not become the main goalkeeper. In 1998 he returned to Dnipro Cherkasy, where he ended his career.

National Team
He played 1 friendly match for Kyrgyzstan. On September 26, 1992, he played 90 minutes in Bishkek against Kazakhstan (1: 1).

Honours
Alga Bishkek
 Kyrgyzstan League: 1992
 Kyrgyzstan Cup: 1992

Dnipro Cherkasy
 Ukrainian Second League: 1992–93

References

External links 
 
 

1973 births
Living people
Soviet footballers
FC Desna Chernihiv players
FC Alga Bishkek players
FC Dnipro Cherkasy players
MFC Mykolaiv players
Ukrainian First League players
Ukrainian Second League players
Ukrainian Amateur Football Championship players 
Kyrgyzstan international footballers
Kyrgyzstani footballers
Kyrgyzstani expatriate footballers
Kyrgyzstani expatriate sportspeople in Ukraine
Kyrgyzstani expatriate sportspeople in Russia
Expatriate footballers in Ukraine
Expatriate footballers in Russia
Association football goalkeepers